Ottakarathevar Panneerselvam, popularly known as OPS (born 14 January 1951) is an Indian politician, 6th Chief Minister of Tamil Nadu from 6 December 2016 to 15 February 2017 and as the 2nd Deputy Chief Minister of Tamil Nadu from 21 August 2017 to 6 May 2021. As a finance minister, he has presented the Tamil Nadu State Budget 11 times. 

He was the former co-ordinator of the AIADMK political party. He was a staunch aide of former chief minister of Tamil Nadu and AIADMK General Secretary J. Jayalalithaa. His first two terms as Chief Minister came when he replaced Jayalalithaa in the role, after she was forced to resign by the courts. His third term began following Jayalalithaa's death and ended two months later, Edappadi K. Palaniswami was selected as the Chief Minister. He was sworn in as the Deputy Chief Minister of Tamil Nadu on 21 August 2017. He held portfolios of Finance, Housing, Rural Housing, Housing Development, Slum Clearance Board and Accommodation Control, Town Planning, Urban Development, and Chennai Metropolitan Development Authority in the Edappadi K. Palaniswami cabinet. On 4 January 2018, O. Panneerselvam elected as Leader of the House in Tamil Nadu Legislative Assembly.

Personal life
Panneerselvam was born on 14 January 1951 in Periyakulam, Tamil Nadu. He obtained a Bachelor of Arts degree from Haji Karutha Rowther Howdia College in Uthamapalayam, Theni district. His close friends Salavuddin from Tenali encouraged him into politics. He also owned some agricultural land. He is married to P. Vijayalakshmi and the couple have three children. He is currently elected from the constituency of Bodinayakkanur, in Theni district. His wife died on 1 September 2021 due to a heart attack and his mother died at the age of 96 on 24 February 2023.

Political career

Early political career
Panneerselvam started his political career periyakulam as a worker of the AIADMK in 1973 after M. G. Ramachandran split from the DMK. He was Chairman of Periyakulam Municipality from 1996 to 2001.

First term as Chief Minister, 2001-2002

He was sworn in as the 6th Chief Minister of Tamil Nadu in September 2001 when the Chief Minister Jayalalithaa was barred from holding office by the Supreme Court of India. During his stint as Chief Minister, he was widely criticised for allegedly heading a puppet government managed by Jayalalithaa. His tenure lasted for six months, from 21 September 2001 to 1 March 2002. In March 2002, he resigned as Chief Minister and Jayalalithaa was sworn in again after the Madras high Court overturned her conviction and she won a by-election from Andipatti assembly constituency. From 2 March 2002 to 13 December 2003, he was the Minister for Public Works, Prohibition and Excise. Subsequently, he was also entrusted with the Revenue department's charge from 13 December 2003 to May 15, 2006.

Leader of the Opposition, 2006
After the party lost the assembly elections in May 2006, Panneerselvam was the leader of the AIADMK legislative party and the Leader of the Opposition in the Tamil Nadu Legislative Assembly for about nine days. In that election, he was elected to be the member of Tamil Nadu legislative assembly from Periyakulam.

Second term as Chief Minister, 2014-2015

In 2011, he contested as an AIADMK candidate from the Bodinayakkanur and won. Again, he became the Minister of Finance in Jayalalithaa's government and held the office from 16 May 2011 to 27 September 2014. He was again entrusted with the responsibility of being Chief Minister of Tamil Nadu on 29 September 2014 when Jayalalitha was convicted in the disproportionate assets case. On 22 May 2015, he resigned as Chief Minister and Jayalalithaa was sworn in again after the Karnataka High Court acquitted her in the disproportionate assets case on 11 May 2015.

A year after his resignation, on 23 May 2015, he was sworn in as Minister for Finance and Public Works Department in Jayalalithaa's government.

Third term as Chief Minister, 2016-2017

On 6 December 2016, Panneerselvam was elected as the Chief Minister of Tamil Nadu following the death of incumbent Chief Minister Jayalalithaa. On 10 December he held his first cabinet meeting as a full-term Chief Minister.. He tended his resignation as the Chief Minister of Tamil Nadu on 6 February 2017 to the governor, who accepted and appointed him as the caretaker Chief Minister of the state to avoid a leadership vacuum, until further measures could be taken..

On 14 February 2017, he was expelled from the AIADMK by party general-secretary, V. K. Sasikala. Shortly after his expulsion, the Governor invited the newly elected legislative leader of the AIADMK, Edappadi K Palaniswami to form the government, following which he took over as chief minister on 16 February 2017.

Political Crisis in AIADMK, 2017 

After his exit from AIADMK Panneerselvam and his supporters appealed to the election commission to take action against the party General Secretary VKS and chief minister EPS .He also made a point to them that he needs the two leaf party symbol to contest in RK Nagar election. Also, Edappadi K. Palaniswami and supporters appealed against him, but the election commission rejected both the appeals and allotted two different symbols to each party.

In August 2017 Edappadi K. Palaniswami and O. Panneerselvam Faction merged. He was made Deputy Chief Minister and was also given finance Ministry.

First Term as Deputy Chief Minister, 2017-2021

On 21 August 2017, Panneerselvam took oath as Deputy Chief Minister of Tamil Nadu on the same day of the Party Merger with then Chief Minister EPS faction.

Leadership Tussle with Edappadi K. Palaniswami, 2022

On 14 June 2022, Citing the party's troubles in the polls, AIADMK district secretaries and other senior party members spoke out to shun the “dual leadership” system and came out publicly in favor of strong unitary leader to strengthen the organisation.

Palaniswami supporters pushed for the change in the party's leadership structure by staging a political coup against AIADMK Coordinator Panneerselvam, who had become weak within the party. According to many sources, of the AIADMK's 75 district secretaries, hardly 10 supported him. Of the party's 66 MLAs, only five MLAs were reportedly on Panneerselvam side and less than 20 percent of the party's general council members behind him ahead of crucial general council meeting on 23 June 2022, which was expected to elect the single leadership to the party.

On 30 June 2022, Palaniswami wrote a letter to Panneerselvam asserting the latter ceased to be the party coordinator as the amendments made to the party's bylaw in the 2020 December executive committee meeting were not recognised in the general council meeting held on June 23.

On 11 July 2022, The Party General Council abolished the dual leadership model and empowered Palaniswami to be the Party Supremo.

Expulsion from AIADMK
On 11 July 2022, Panneerselvam was expelled as Party Treasurer and primary member of the party for "anti-party" activities by the AIADMK General Council. Dindigul Sreenivasan was made Party Treasurer succeeding him. On 17 August, Justice G. Jayachandran of the Madras High Court ruled the expulsion of Panneerselvam and the decisions of the AIADMK General Council as invalid.

On 2 September 2022, a division bench of the High Court upheld the decisions of the AIADMK general council meeting held on 11 July 2022 and set aside the previous court order of the single judge in the appeal case of  Palaniswami, thus effectively restoring unitary leadership. On 12 September 2022, the Supreme Court dismissed the plea of Panneerselvam challenging the order of Madras High Court to handover the keys to Palaniswami. On 23 February 2023, the Supreme Court of India upheld the decisions of the AIADMK general council meeting held on 11 July 2022, and dismissed the petition of O. Panneerselvam challenging the previous order of the division bench, thus affirming unitary leadership under Edappadi K Palaniswami.

Controversy
A report in The Week magazine in December 2017, alleged that Panneerselvam was on the sand mining baron Sekhar Reddy's payroll. Reddy was arrested by the Income Tax department in March 2017 on money laundering charges. Five pages of the Reddy's Diary suggest alleged payments made to several AIADMK ministers, MLAs, and many others, amounting to more than ₹ 48 crore. At least five payments in which the word 'OPS' or the name of his secretary Ramesh was written are shown in the contents of the diary.

Elections contested 
He is one among the politicians who won all the elections he has participated.

Tamil Nadu Legislative elections

See also
 First Panneerselvam ministry
 Second Panneerselvam ministry
 Third Panneerselvam ministry

References

All India Anna Dravida Munnetra Kazhagam politicians
Chief Ministers of Tamil Nadu
1951 births
Living people
State cabinet ministers of Tamil Nadu
Chief ministers from All India Anna Dravida Munnetra Kazhagam
Leaders of the Opposition in Tamil Nadu
Deputy Chief Ministers of Tamil Nadu
Indian Tamil politicians
Tamil Nadu politicians
Tamil Nadu MLAs 2011–2016
Tamil Nadu MLAs 2016–2021
Tamil Nadu MLAs 2021–2026